The Los Angeles Dodgers are a Major League Baseball (MLB) franchise based in Los Angeles, California. They play in the National League West division. Since the institution of MLB's Rule 4 Draft, the Dodgers have selected 64 players in the first round. Officially known as the "First-Year Player Draft", the Rule 4 Draft is MLB's primary mechanism for assigning players from high schools, colleges, and other amateur clubs to its franchises. The draft order is determined based on the previous season's standings, with the team possessing the worst record receiving the first pick. In addition, teams which lost free agents in the previous off-season may be awarded compensatory or supplementary picks.

Of the 66 players picked in the first round by Los Angeles, 37 have been pitchers, the most of any position; 24 of these were right-handed, while 12 were left-handed. Nine players at shortstop and eight in the outfield were selected, while five catchers, three first basemen, and three third basemen were taken as well. The team also selected two players at second base. Seven of the players came from high schools or universities in the state of Texas, while California follows with six players.

Nine Dodgers first-round picks have won a World Series championship with the team. Pitchers Bob Welch (1977) and Steve Howe (1979) played with the 1981 championship team. Shortstop Dave Anderson (1981) and first baseman Franklin Stubbs (1982) were a part of the 1988 championship team. Catcher Mike Scioscia (1976) won championships with both teams. Pitchers Clayton Kershaw (2006) and Walker Buehler (2015), shortstop Corey Seager (2012), and catcher Will Smith (2016) all played with the 2020 championship team. Welch was also on the Oakland Athletics' 1988 team which lost to the Dodgers in the 1988 Series. Howe, Seager, and Rick Sutcliffe (1974) each won the MLB Rookie of the Year award.

The Dodgers have made 11 selections in the supplemental round of the draft and have never made the first overall selection. They have also had 16 compensatory picks since the institution of the First-Year Player Draft in 1965. These additional picks are provided when a team loses a particularly valuable free agent in the prior off-season, or, more recently, if a team fails to sign a draft pick from the previous year. The Dodgers have failed to sign one of their first-round picks, Luke Hochevar (2005), but received no compensation pick.

Key

Picks

See also
Los Angeles Dodgers minor league players

Footnotes
 Through the 2012 draft, free agents were evaluated by the Elias Sports Bureau and rated "Type A", "Type B", or not compensation-eligible. If a team offered arbitration to a player but that player refused and subsequently signed with another team, the original team was able to receive additional draft picks. If a "Type A" free agent left in this way, his previous team received a supplemental pick and a compensatory pick from the team with which he signed. If a "Type B" free agent left in this way, his previous team received only a supplemental pick. Since the 2013 draft, free agents are no longer classified by type; instead, compensatory picks are only awarded if the team offered its free agent a contract worth at least the average of the 125 current richest MLB contracts. However, if the free agent's last team acquired the player in a trade during the last year of his contract, it is ineligible to receive compensatory picks for that player.
The Dodgers lost their first-round pick in 1978 to the Pittsburgh Pirates as compensation for signing free agent Terry Forster.
The Dodgers gained a compensatory first-round pick in 1979 from the Pittsburgh Pirates for losing free agent Lee Lacy.
The Dodgers gained a compensatory first-round pick in 1979 from the New York Yankees for losing free agent Tommy John.
The Dodgers gained a compensatory first-round pick in 1989 from the New York Yankees for losing free agent Steve Sax.
The Dodgers gained a supplemental pick in 1989 for losing free agent Steve Sax.
The Dodgers lost their first-round pick in 1991 to the New York Mets as compensation for signing free agent Darryl Strawberry.
The Dodgers lost their original first-round pick in 1992 to the Toronto Blue Jays as compensation for signing free agent Tom Candiotti but gained a supplemental pick for losing free agent Eddie Murray.
The Dodgers gained a supplemental pick in 1992 for losing free agent Mike Morgan.
The Dodgers gained a supplemental pick in 1999 for losing free agent Scott Radinsky.
The Dodgers lost their first-round pick in 2001 to the Atlanta Braves as compensation for signing free agent Andy Ashby.
The Dodgers gained a supplemental pick in 2002 for losing free agent Chan Ho Park.
The Dodgers gained a compensatory first-round pick in 2004 from the New York Yankees for losing free agent Paul Quantrill.
The Dodgers gained a supplemental pick in 2004 for losing free agent Paul Quantrill.
The Dodgers lost their original first-round pick in 2005 to the Boston Red Sox as compensation for signing free agent Derek Lowe but gained a supplemental pick for losing free agent Adrián Beltré.
The Dodgers gained a compensatory first-round pick in 2006 from the Los Angeles Angels of Anaheim for losing free agent Jeff Weaver.
The Dodgers gained a supplemental pick in 2006 for losing free agent Jeff Weaver.
The Dodgers gained a compensatory first-round pick in 2007 from the Boston Red Sox for losing free agent Julio Lugo.
The Dodgers gained a supplemental pick in 2007 for losing free agent Julio Lugo.
The Dodgers gained a supplemental pick in 2009 for losing free agent Derek Lowe.
The Dodgers gained a supplemental pick in 2012 for losing free agent Rod Barajas.
The Dodgers gained a compensatory first-round pick in 2015 from the Boston Red Sox for losing free agent Hanley Ramírez.
The Dodgers gained a compensatory first-round pick in 2016 from the Arizona Diamondbacks for losing free agent Zack Greinke.
The Dodgers gained a compensatory first-round pick in 2016 for failing to sign Kyle Funkhouser in the 2015 draft.
The Dodgers gained a compensatory first-round pick in 2019 for failing to sign J. T. Ginn in the 2018 draft.
The Dodgers did not have a first round pick in 2022 as a result of going over the competitive balance tax during the 2021 season

References
General references

In-text citations

First-round draft picks
Los Angeles Dodgers